Chiropodomys (or pencil-tailed tree mice) is a genus of Old World rats and mice native to Southeast Asia and northeast India. They are tree-dwelling, very small mice, mostly found in tropical rainforest. In total six extant species have been identified, but only one of these, Chiropodomys gliroides, is common and widely distributed, and has been extensively studied.

Species
Genus Chiropodomys — pencil-tailed tree mice:
Palawan pencil-tailed tree mouse, Chiropodomys calamianensis Taylor, 1934, Palawan and neighboring islands
Indomalayan pencil-tailed tree mouse, Chiropodomys gliroides Blyth, 1856, northeast India, southeastern China, mainland Southeast Asia, Sumatra, Java
Koopman's pencil-tailed tree mouse, Chiropodomys karlkoopmani Musser, 1979, Mentawai Islands
Large pencil-tailed tree mouse, Chiropodomys major Thomas, 1893, Borneo
Gray-bellied pencil-tailed tree mouse, Chiropodomys muroides Medway, 1965, Borneo
Small pencil-tailed tree mouse, Chiropodomys pusillus Thomas, 1893, Borneo
 †Chiropodomys maximus, Thailand
 †Chiropodomys primitivus, southern China

Description
Species of Chiropodomys have a body length of 7 to 12 cm, plus a tail of 9 to 17 cm. They are generally gray or brown on the back and white underneath. The tail is only sparsely covered with hair, but has somewhat more at the end, giving the appearance of a pencil, thus the genus name.

Chiropodomys gliroides is particularly common in bamboo forest. It is active at night, sleeps during the day in a nest in the bamboo, padded with leaves. It eats exclusively plants.

Previously, it was thought that Chiropodomys were closely related to the genus Hapalomys (marmoset rats), with both forming a clade with Micromys and Vandeleuria; however, more recent phylogenetic studies support them being closely allied with the Australasian mice and rats of the tribe Hydromyini, either as a distinct tribe of their own or as a group within Hydromyini.

References

 Ronald M. Nowak: Walker's Mammals of the World. Johns Hopkins University Press, 1999 
 Wells K, Pfeiffer M, Lakim MB & Linsenmair KE (2004) "Arboreal spacing patterns of the Large pencil-tailed tree mouse Chiropodomys major in a rainforest in Sabah, Malaysia." Ecotropica 10 : 15-22
  Wells K, Pfeiffer M, Lakim MB & Linsenmair KE (2004) "Use of arboreal and terrestrial space by a small mammal community in a tropical rain forest in Borneo, Malaysia." Journal of Biogeography 31 : 641-652.

This article is based on a translation of an article from the German Wikipedia, retrieved on November 22, 2006.

Chiropodomys
Fauna of Southeast Asia
Taxa named by Wilhelm Peters